Heliocheilus abaccheutus is a moth in the family Noctuidae. It is endemic to Queensland, Australia.

External links
Australian Faunal Directory

Heliocheilus
Moths of Australia

Insects described in 1999
Endemic fauna of Australia